Yippee, Yappee and Yahooey is a Hanna-Barbera animated television series that premiered September 16, 1964. It was presented as a segment of The Peter Potamus Show, along with Breezly and Sneezly and Peter Potamus.

Plot
Yippee, Yappee and Yahooey are dogs who serve the King as his Royal Guards. They are usually called the goofy guards by the king. They must always protect, serve and obey the King. They are loosely based on the Three Musketeers. The King doesn't like calling them, because due to their incompetence the King ends up being accidentally hurt, bruised, squashed, and involved in various disasters in each episode.  At times, the three heroes find themselves fighting a fire-breathing dragon and other villains. A common mistake in nearly every short is that Yippee, Yappee and Yahooey's voices tend to get mixed up with one another. Irving Berlin wrote a stage show while in the Army during World War I entitled "Yip Yip Yaphank" at Camp Yaphank from which names were taken for this cartoon. Yahooey spoke very much like Jerry Lewis.

Episode list
The show had 23 episodes of 6 minutes each.

Voice cast
 Doug Young - Yippee
 Hal Smith - Yappee, The King
 Daws Butler - Yahooey

DVD release
The episode "The Volunteers" is available on the DVD Saturday Morning Cartoons 1960's vol. 1.
The episode "Black Bart" is available on the DVD Saturday Morning Cartoons 1960's vol. 2.

Pop culture
In the later animated TV series Animaniacs, the character Slappy Squirrel claims Yakko, Wakko and Dot remind her of a young Yippee, Yappee and Yahooey. The Warners look puzzled, and Dot said she does not know who they are, or what she meant by that statement.

Yippee, Yappee and Yahooey appear in Jellystone!, with Yippee played by Jim Conroy, Yappee by Grace Helbig, and Yahooey by C. H. Greenblatt. Yappee is female in the show.

Yippee, Yappee and Yahooey in other languages
 Spanish: Viva, Bravo y Hurra
 Italian: Tippete, Tappete, Toppete
 Brazilian: Mosquete, Mosquito e Moscato

References

External links
 Yippee, Yappee and Yahooey at Don Markstein's Toonopedia. Archived from the original on September 11, 2015.
 Yippee, Yappee & Yahooey at Wingnuttoons

1960s American animated television series
1964 American television series debuts
1966 American television series endings
American children's animated comedy television series
Animated television series about dogs
English-language television shows
Television series by Hanna-Barbera
Hanna-Barbera characters